The 2015 Lory Meagher Cup was the 7th staging of the Lory Meagher Cup, the Gaelic Athletic Association's fourth tier inter-county hurling championship. The championship began on 2 May 2015 and ended on 6 June 2015.

Longford were the defending champions but were successful in gaining promotion to the Nicky Rackard Cup. Lancashire fielded a team for the very first time.

On 6 June 2015, Fermanagh won the championship following a 3-16 to 1-17 defeat of Sligo in the cup final. This was their first Lory Meagher Cup title.

Leitrim's Pádraig O'Donnell was the championship's top scorer with 2-32. John Duffy of Fermanagh was the Lory Meagher Player of the Year.

Table

Rounds 1 to 5

Final

Top scorers

Overall

Single game

References

Lory
Lory Meagher Cup